James P. Smith (born August 4, 1957) is an American ice hockey administrator, who has served as the president of USA Hockey since 2015.

Career
Smith was elected as the organization's fifth president since 1937 in 2015. He succeeded Ron DeGregorio, who retired after 12 years in the position. He was re-elected in 2018. Smith is a head coach of the Hornets Sled Hockey team, which skates out of Mount Prospect Ice Arena. He also is the co-founder of Allegra Marketing, Print and Mail, located in Elk Grove Village, Illinois.

References

1957 births
Ice hockey executives
Living people
People from Princeton, Wisconsin
USA Hockey personnel